丘 may refer to:

Qiū (surname), a Chinese surname
Kǒng Qiū, better known as Confucius